John St John, 2nd Baron St John of Bletso (died 1596) was an English peer. The son of Oliver St John, 1st Baron St John of Bletso, and Agnes Fisher, he succeeded to the barony upon his father's death in 1582.

John St John was M.P. for Bedfordshire from 1563 to 1567. In January 1585 he was appointed the keeper of Mary, Queen of Scots, at Tutbury Castle. John was reluctant to accept the commission and argued at length with Lord Burghley before accepting, but in 1586 was one of the peers who judged her guilty. He was Lord Lieutenant of Huntingdonshire from about 1587 until his death.

St John married, about 1575, Katherine Dormer, daughter of Dorothy (born Catesby) and Sir William Dormer of Wing, Buckinghamshire and died on 23 October 1596 without male heirs. He was buried at Bletsoe. He was succeeded by his younger brother. His daughter Ann married William Howard, 3rd Baron Howard of Effingham.  His widow died in 1615 and was buried in Westminster Abbey.

References

1596 deaths
Lord-Lieutenants of Huntingdonshire
John
Year of birth missing
16th-century births
English MPs 1563–1567
16th-century English nobility
Barons St John of Bletso